Daniel Robert Drew (born 22 May 1996) is an Australian cricketer. He made his first-class debut on 7 December 2019, for South Australia in the 2019–20 Sheffield Shield season. He made his Twenty20 debut on 7 December 2021, for the Adelaide Strikers in the 2021–22 Big Bash League season.

References

External links
 

1996 births
Living people
Australian cricketers
Adelaide Strikers cricketers
South Australia cricketers
Place of birth missing (living people)